Towerson is a surname. Notable people with the surname include:

Gabriel Towerson (1635?–1697), English clergyman
Gabriel Towerson (East India Company) (1576–1623), captain and agent for the East India Company
William Towerson (died  1631), English merchant